Chet Doxas is a saxophonist, clarinetist and composer based in Brooklyn, NY. His work has been nominated for numerous Juno, Grammy and Academy Awards. Doxas has released a number of albums as a leader and has received accolades for his work as a performer, composer and arranger.  His work can be heard on over one hundred recordings.

Early life 
Originally from Montreal, Quebec., Doxas was born into a musical family.

Life and career

Doxas was born to parents who were teachers. In his youth, he was in a swing jazz ensemble which performed around Montreal. He later attended McGill University, where he would perform his music. In 2014, Doxas moved to New York City to further his career.

After recording Big Sky and Dive (which he recorded before moving to New York), Doxas's album Rich in Symbols was nominated for a Juno award for Best Jazz solo album of 2018. The album, which conveys a rock-world approach to jazz, features guitar work on select tracks by Dave Nugent. Doxas has also been a member of the Sam Roberts Band where he would play the woodwind instrument.

References

Living people
McGill University alumni
Canadian jazz saxophonists
21st-century saxophonists
21st-century Canadian male musicians
Year of birth missing (living people)
Whirlwind Recordings artists